In signal processing, a comb filter is a filter implemented by adding a delayed version of a signal to itself, causing constructive and destructive interference. The frequency response of a comb filter consists of a series of regularly spaced notches in between regularly spaced peaks (sometimes called teeth) giving the appearance of a comb.

Applications

Comb filters are employed in a variety of signal processing applications, including:

 Cascaded integrator–comb (CIC) filters, commonly used for anti-aliasing during interpolation and decimation operations that change the sample rate of a discrete-time system.
 2D and 3D comb filters implemented in hardware (and occasionally software) in PAL and NTSC analog television decoders, reduce artifacts such as dot crawl.
 Audio signal processing, including delay, flanging, physical modelling synthesis and digital waveguide synthesis. If the delay is set to a few milliseconds, a comb filter can model the effect of acoustic standing waves in a cylindrical cavity or in a vibrating string.
 In astronomy the astro-comb promises to increase the precision of existing spectrographs by nearly a hundredfold.

In acoustics, comb filtering can arise as an unwanted artifact. For instance, two loudspeakers playing the same signal at different distances from the listener, create a comb filtering effect on the audio. In any enclosed space, listeners hear a mixture of direct sound and reflected sound. The reflected sound takes a longer, delayed path compared to the direct sound, and a comb filter is created where the two mix at the listener.

Implementation
Comb filters exist in two forms, feedforward and feedback; which refer to the direction in which signals are delayed before they are added to the input.

Comb filters may be implemented in discrete time or continuous time forms which are very similar.

Feedforward form

The general structure of a feedforward comb filter is described by the difference equation: 

The  transform of both sides of the equation yields:

The transfer function is defined as:

Frequency response

The frequency response of a discrete-time system expressed in the -domain, is obtained by substitution . Therefore, for the feedforward comb filter:

Using Euler's formula, the frequency response is also given by

Often of interest is the magnitude response, which ignores phase. This is defined as:

In the case of the feedforward comb filter, this is:

The  term is constant, whereas the  term varies periodically. Hence the magnitude response of the comb filter is periodic.

Some important properties:
The response periodically drops to a local minimum (sometimes known as a notch), and periodically rises to a local maximum (sometimes known as a peak or a tooth).
.
The levels of the maxima and minima are always equidistant from 1.
When , the minima have zero amplitude. In this case, the minima are sometimes known as nulls.

Impulse response
The feedforward comb filter is one of the simplest finite impulse response filters. Its response is simply the initial impulse with a second impulse after the delay.

Pole–zero interpretation
Looking again at the -domain transfer function of the feedforward comb filter:

the numerator is equal to zero whenever . This has  solutions, equally spaced around a circle in the complex plane; these are the zeros of the transfer function. This leads to a pole–zero plot like the ones shown.

Feedback form

Similarly, the general structure of a feedback comb filter is  described by the difference equation:

The transfer function is therefore:

Frequency response

Substituting  into the -domain expression for the feedback comb filter:

The magnitude response is as follows:

Again, the response is periodic, as the graphs demonstrate. The feedback comb filter has some properties in common with the feedforward form:
The response periodically drops to a local minimum and rises to a local maximum.
.

However, there are also some important differences because the magnitude response has a term in the denominator:
The levels of the maxima and minima are no longer equidistant from 1.
The filter is only stable if  is strictly less than 1. As can be seen from the graphs, as  increases, the amplitude of the maxima rises increasingly rapidly.

Impulse response
The feedback comb filter is a simple type of infinite impulse response filter. If stable, the response simply consists of a repeating series of impulses decreasing in amplitude over time.

Pole–zero interpretation
Looking again at the -domain transfer function of the feedback comb filter:

The denominator is equal to zero whenever . This has  solutions, equally spaced around a circle in the complex plane; these are the poles of the transfer function. This leads to a pole–zero plot like the ones shown below.

Continuous-time comb filters
Comb filters may also be implemented in continuous time. The feedforward form may be described by the equation:

where  is the delay (measured in seconds). This has the following transfer function:

The feedforward form consists of an infinite number of zeros spaced along the jω axis.

The feedback form has the equation:

and the following transfer function:

The feedback form consists of an infinite number of poles spaced along the jω axis.

Continuous-time implementations share all the properties of the respective discrete-time implementations.

See also
Dirac comb
Fabry–Pérot interferometer

References

External links

Signal processing
Filter theory